San Carlos is a canton in the Alajuela province of Costa Rica. The capital city of the canton is Ciudad Quesada.

History 
San Carlos was created on 26 September 1911 by decree 17.

Geography 
San Carlos has an area of  km² and a mean elevation of  metres.

The canton encompasses a major portion of the San Carlos Plain, a wide expanse on the Caribbean side of the Cordillera Central (Central Mountain Range). San Carlos reaches north to the border of Nicaragua, east to the province of Heredia, west to the province of Guanacaste, and south into the heights of the Cordillera.

San Carlos is noted as the home of Arenal Volcano, one of the most active volcanoes in the world. The canton's principal economic activities include the production of oranges, yuca, pineapple, sugar cane, beef and dairy products. More than 50% of the national dairy production in Costa Rica comes from San Carlos.

Districts 
The canton of San Carlos is subdivided into the following districts:
 Quesada
 Florencia
 Buenavista
 Aguas Zarcas
 Venecia
 Pital
 La Fortuna
 La Tigra
 La Palmera
 Venado
 Cutris
 Monterrey
 Pocosol

Demographics 

For the 2011 census, San Carlos had a population of  inhabitants.

Transportation

Road transportation 
The canton is covered by the following road routes:

Education
There is a branch of the Costa Rica Institute of Technology in Santa Clara, San Carlos.

Sports
In federated soccer, San Carlos is represented by Asociación Deportiva San Carlos. This association also gives its name to numerous minor league teams that have notably excelled at the national level.

References

External links
 SIR-ZEE Web portal for business and government in the Northern Zone

Cantons of Alajuela Province
Populated places in Alajuela Province